Maunga Kākaramea (also known officially as Rainbow Mountain) is a  high dacite volcano located between Rotorua and Taupō in the North Island Volcanic Plateau.  It has multiple steaming features and a picturesque crater lake reached by a short walk from the nearest road and has a nearby geothermal area.

Geography
Maunga Kākaramea (meaning mountain of colored earth, sometime called Maungakakaramea and also known in colloquial English as Mount Kakaramea - but do not confuse with Kakaramea another mountain) is located at the western borders of the Okataina Volcanic Centre. To the north west is the still active Waimangu Volcanic Rift Valley and closer to the south west the Maungakaramea hot springs.

Geology
Much of the ground has been altered by steam action, which is most marked on the southern slopes of the mountain, extending almost to the summit. The steam has created fumarole clays of decomposed rhyolite. The six craters on the mountain are likely of hydrothermal origin.  There have been quite large hydrothermal eruptions from areas of the mountain and nearby. This erupted material overlie the 232 CE Hatepe eruption pumice resulting in estimated eruption ages of about 1300 CE. Sulphur deposits and natural petroleum seeps occur in the area. The bare northern slopes are adjacent to the Ngapouri-Rotomahana Fault which is a splay of the Paeroa Fault at the eastern margin of the Taupō Rift of the Taupō Volcanic Zone. These slope's steam activity was much more marked following the last Tarawera eruption than at present. The hot water spring activity is all to the south of the fault line. Accordingly just to the north we have an area that is displacing at a rate of 7.2 ± 0.4 mm/yr explaining the areas complex geology.

Tourism
Its emerald coloured crater lake is a short but steep walk for the fit and contrasts with ochre coloured cliffs. The flora is somewhat stunted both because of the geothermal activity but also it is in the area affected by the 1886 eruption of Mount Tarawera.

See also
 List of volcanoes in New Zealand

References

External links
 

Landforms of the Bay of Plenty Region
Hot springs of New Zealand
1886 eruption of Mount Tarawera
Volcanoes of the Bay of Plenty Region
Mountains of the Bay of Plenty Region
Taupō Volcanic Zone
Geothermal areas in New Zealand
Okataina Volcanic Centre